Maternal is a British medical drama television drama series created by Jacqui Honess-Martin. The series began broadcast on ITV1 on 16 January 2023, as well as on ITVX.

Plot
Three female doctors return, after the COVID-19 pandemic, to frontline medicine after their maternity leave.

Cast
 Parminder Nagra as Dr. Maryam Afridi
 Lara Pulver as Dr. Catherine MacDiarmid
 Lisa McGrillis as Dr. Helen Cavendish
 Raza Jaffrey as Dr. Jack Oliviera
 Oliver Chris as Dr. Guy Cavendish
 Abhin Galeya as Raz Farooqui
 Julie Graham as Dr. Susan Fisher
 Alexander Karim as Lards Nordstrom

Episodes
All episodes were made available on ITVX on January 16, 2023 prior to their linear broadcast.

Reception
The series received positive reviews from critics. Isobel Lewis from The Independent gave the first episode four out of five stars, praising the acting, dialogue and topicality of the drama. Lucy Mangan of The Guardian awarded the first episode four stars out of five, praising the depth of the three lead characters, and remarked that it had 'grit in the storytelling oyster that produces something rather wonderful'. Anita Singh in The Telegraph also gave it four stars out of five, proclaiming it as superior to another recent medical drama, This Is Going to Hurt. In a more mixed review, Carol Midgley in The Times gave it three stars, finding the show reliant on cliches.

References

External links 
 

2020s British medical television series
2020s British drama television series
2020s British workplace drama television series
2023 British television series debuts
ITV television dramas
Television series by ITV Studios
English-language television shows
Television shows set in England